It Ain't Easy is a studio album by American country artist Janie Fricke. It was released in September 1982 via Columbia Records and contained ten tracks. The disc was the seventh studio release of Fricke's career and reached the top 15 of the American country LP's chart. The album spawned three singles. Two of its singles "You Don't Know Love" and "He's a Heartache (Looking for a Place to Happen)" reached the number one spot on the North American country songs charts.

Background and content
Janie Fricke struggled for several years to craft a musical identity until she began focusing on ballads in 1980. Her breakthrough came later that year with the top five chart hit "Down to My Last Broken Heart". She changed towards a more up-tempo country pop musical style with her next album release It Ain't Easy. Fricke also shifted producers for the album, working for the first time with Bob Montgomery. The album was recorded in June 1982 at the Soundshop Studio located in Franklin, Tennessee. It Ain't Easy contained a total of ten tracks. Most of the album's material were new recordings. Two of these tracks were composed by songwriter Jeff Silbar ("He's a Heartache" and "Who Better Than an Angel") and one was composed by singer-songwriter Mark Gray ("It Ain't Easy Bein' Easy"). The album also included a cover of Sami Jo's country pop crossover single from 1974 "Tell Me a Lie".

Release, reception and singles

It Ain't Easy was originally released in September 1982 on Columbia Records. It was the seventh studio album released in Fricke's career. The album was originally distributed as a vinyl LP and a cassette. Both formats offered an identical track listing. It was later reissued to digital markets including Apple Music. AllMusic's Tom Roland gave the album three out of five stars in his review: "Here she sounds like a strong woman who's very familiar with heartache, and producer Bob Montgomery gives her some rockin' material to shout on." The disc spent a total of 58 weeks on the American Billboard country albums chart, peaking at number 15 in January 1983. It was Fricke's longest-charting album in her career.

Three singles were spawned from the project It Ain't Easy. The first of its singles was the title track "It Ain't Easy Bein' Easy", which was issued by Columbia Records in August 1982. The song spent one week at the number one spot on the Billboard Hot Country Songs chart in November 1982. It was followed in January 1983 by the second single "You Don't Know Love". It spent 19 weeks on the Billboard country chart and reached number four by April 1983. The third and final single was "He's a Heartache (Looking for a Place to Happen)". The track was issued as a single in May 1983. The song became Fricke's fourth number one single on the Billboard country chart, spending one week there. In Canada, both the title track and "He's a Heartache" would also reach the number one spot on the RPM country list. Although originally released on Fricke's It Ain't Easy LP, "Tell Me a Lie" was officially released as a single in September 1983 to help promote her next album Love Lies.

Track listings

Original versions

Digital version

Personnel
All credits are adapted from the liner notes of It Ain't Easy'.

Musical and technical personnel
Janie Fricke - lead vocals
Janie Fricke, Judy Rodman, Bill Warren, Tony Wiggins, Benny Wilson - backing vocals
Ron Oates - piano
Bob Wray - bass guitar
James Stroud - drums
Don Gorman (track 1), Dann Huff, Kenny Mims - guitar
Don Gorman - guitar solo (track 1)
Shane Keister - keyboards

Charts

Accolades

!
|-
| 1983
| Country Music Association Awards
| Album of the Year for It Ain't Easy''
| 
| 
|-
|}

Release history

References

1982 albums
Albums produced by Bob Montgomery (songwriter)
Columbia Records albums
Janie Fricke albums